Polystachya concreta, the greater yellowspike orchid, is a species of orchid native to tropical and subtropical America, Africa and Asia.

Synonyms
Epidendrum concretum Jacq. is the basionym. Other synonyms include:
Callista flavescens (Lindl.) Kuntze
Cranichis luteola Sw.
Dendrobium flavescens Lindl.
Dendrobium polystachyum Sw.
Dendrorkis estrellensis (Rchb.f.) Kuntze
Dendrorkis extinctoria (Rchb.f.) Kuntze
Dendrorkis minuta (Aubl.) Kuntze
Dendrorkis polystachyon (Sw.) Kuntze
Dendrorkis purpurea (Wight) Kuntze
Dendrorkis wightii (Rchb.f.) Kuntze
Dendrorkis zollingeri (Rchb.f.) Kuntze
Epidendrum concretum Jacq.
Epidendrum minutum Aubl.
Maxillaria luteola (Sw.) Beer
Maxillaria purpurea (Wight) Beer
Onychium flavescens Blume
Polystachya bicolor Rolfe
Polystachya caquetana Schltr.
Polystachya colombiana Schltr.
Polystachya cubensis Schltr.
Polystachya estrellensis Rchb.f.
Polystachya extinctoria Rchb.f.
Polystachya flavescens (Blume) J.J.Sm.
Polystachya kraenzliniana Pabst
Polystachya luteola Hook.
Polystachya luteola Wight
Polystachya minuta (Aubl.) Frapp. ex Cordem.
Polystachya penangensis Ridl.
Polystachya pleistantha Kraenzl.
Polystachya purpurea var. lutescens Gagnep.
Polystachya purpurea Wight
Polystachya reichenbachiana Kraenzl.
Polystachya siamensis Ridl.
Polystachya singapurensis Ridl.
Polystachya wightii Rchb.f.
Polystachya zeylanica Lindl.
Polystachya zollingeri Rchb.f.

References

concreta
Orchids of Asia
Orchids of Africa
Orchids of Central America
Orchids of North America
Orchids of South America
Orchids of Florida
Flora without expected TNC conservation status